The Albuquerque mayoral election of 2005 was held on October 4, 2005 to elect the Mayor of Albuquerque. Incumbent Democrat Martin Chavez won reelection, with 41,023 votes (47.2%) to  City Councilor Eric Griego's 22,523 (26%), City Councilor Brad Winter's 21,352 (24.6%), and realtor David Steele's 1,859 (2.1%).

Candidates
Martin Chavez (Party affiliation: Democratic), incumbent mayor
Eric Griego (Party affiliation: Democratic), City Councilor
David Steele  (Party affiliation: Republican), realtor
Brad Winter (Party affiliation: Republican), City Councilor

References 

Mayoral elections in Albuquerque, New Mexico
2005 New Mexico elections
Albuquerque